Interstate 630 (I-630) in Arkansas is an east–west connector within Little Rock. It is also known as the Wilbur D. Mills Freeway and starts at I-30, U.S. Highway 65 (US 65), US 67, and US 167, traveling west through downtown Little Rock to I-430 and Chenal Parkway.

History
The project was first conceived in the 1930s and was first planned by the Pulaski County Planning Board in their 1941 report. After having many higher powers deny their plans, construction was started by the city of Little Rock in the 1960s as the east–west Expressway or 8th Street Expressway and was not originally an Interstate or an Arkansas state highway.

After it was added to the Interstate System, Little Rock initially renamed it for Mills; however, when the Arkansas State Highway Department (AHTD) formally brought it into the state highway system as required by Arkansas law, they removed the name, as their policy at the time prohibited the naming of state highways after individuals. AHTD later changed its policy and readopted the Mills name early in the new millennium. As of autumn 2019, the highway is now named "Gold Star Families Memorial Highway".

The highway connects burgeoning West Little Rock to the downtown core. It feeds into I-430, a north–south route which serves western Little Rock.

Exit list

References

6
30-6
30-6
Transportation in Pulaski County, Arkansas
Transportation in Little Rock, Arkansas